The 1976 Stanley Cup Finals was the championship series of the National Hockey League's (NHL) 1975–76 season, and the culmination of the 1976 Stanley Cup playoffs. It was contested by the two-time defending champion Philadelphia Flyers, making their third consecutive finals appearance, and the Montreal Canadiens. The Canadiens would win the best-of-seven series, four games to none to win their 19th Stanley Cup in franchise history.

Paths to the Finals
Montreal defeated the Chicago Black Hawks 4–0 and the New York Islanders 4–1 to advance to the final.

Philadelphia defeated the Toronto Maple Leafs 4–3 and the Boston Bruins 4–1 to make it to the final.

Game summaries
Guy Lafleur scored the first two finals goals in his career, both game-winners.

Reggie Leach scored four goals in the Finals, and nineteen times in total in the playoffs to win the Conn Smythe Trophy even though the Flyers lost the Cup to the Canadiens. He is the only non-goaltender in NHL history to be named MVP of the playoffs in an unsuccessful cause, and the third of only five as of 2019. His accomplishment followed Roger Crozier (Detroit Red Wings, in ) and Glenn Hall (St. Louis Blues) and preceded Ron Hextall (Philadelphia) and Jean-Sebastien Giguere (Mighty Ducks of Anaheim).

Reggie Leach won the Conn Smythe Trophy as playoff MVP.

Team rosters

Montreal Canadiens

|}

Philadelphia Flyers

|}

Stanley Cup engraving
The 1976 Stanley Cup was presented to Canadiens captain Yvan Cournoyer by NHL President Clarence Campbell following the Canadiens 5–3 win over the Flyers in game four.

The following Canadiens players and staff had their names engraved on the Stanley Cup

1975–76 Montreal Canadiens

See also
 1975–76 NHL season

Notes

References

 
 

Stanley Cup
Stanley Cup Finals
Montreal Canadiens games
Philadelphia Flyers games
Stanley Cup Finals
Stanley Cup Finals
Ice hockey competitions in Montreal
Ice hockey competitions in Philadelphia
1970s in Montreal
1970s in Philadelphia
Stanley Cup Finals
Stanley Cup Finals